The Indiana–Kentucky rivalry is a college sports rivalry between the Indiana University Bloomington Hoosiers and the University of Kentucky Wildcats. The football game was previously played for a wooden Bourbon Barrel trophy, which was discontinued in 1999.

Men's basketball

Indiana and Kentucky played against each other in men's basketball for the first time on December 18, 1924. Since 1969 the two teams met at least once a season through the 2011-2012 season. The location of the game alternated between Assembly Hall in Bloomington and Rupp Arena in Lexington. From 1991 to 2005, the game was held at neutral sites in Indianapolis and Louisville. A scheduling conflict with Louisville's Freedom Hall in 2006 forced the series back to the schools' respective campuses. Of the 55 games between IU and UK, 48 have been played in December. There have been a total of six overtime games in this rivalry series, the most for any non-conference Kentucky rival. The rivalry has been the subject of substantial commentary and media interest. ESPN commentator Dick Vitale said of the rivalry, "Don't you get excited in the world of basketball thinking about Kentucky and Indiana playing? Two Goliaths, two elite programs." Fellow commentator Eamonn Brennan called it "one of the great nonconference rivalries in the sport, which features the two storied, flagship, blueblood programs from the nation's two most basketball-obsessed states, states which just so happen to share a border." The intensity of the rivalry is augmented by the proximity of Indiana and Kentucky. Although the two teams had played every season since 1969, a dispute over whether future games should be played at the schools' respective home courts or at nearby neutral sites led to the cancellation of the game for the 2012–13 season.

The Indiana–Kentucky basketball rivalry is all the more intense because the two schools have consistently been among the nation's elite men's basketball teams. Remarkably, in 11 of the 56 meetings between Indiana and Kentucky, one of the schools has been ranked number one, which is nearly 20 percent of the meetings. Kentucky has won eight NCAA championships and has appeared in seventeen Final Fours, while Indiana has won five NCAA championships and appeared in eight Final Fours. Combining thirteen national championships over the last 72 years, Indiana and Kentucky have captured 18% of the national championships, nearly one every five years. Notable storylines of the rivalry also involve major upsets by both teams and high-profile, outspoken coaches, including Bob Knight and Adolph Rupp.

High-profile feuds and incidents between the schools' programs have fueled the rivalry over the years. Indiana coach Bob Knight would frequently suggest that Kentucky violated NCAA recruiting rules. When asked about the rivalry by Kentucky announcer Cawood Ledford, Knight said, "You know, Cawood, with all the crap that has gone on down here over the years with recruiting and all, these games are not nearly as special to me as you might think." Referring to UK's reputation for putting less-than-outstanding public citizens on the team, Knight later said, "I like to think of C. M. Newton [University of Kentucky Athletic Director] as the school's director of corrections." After Knight kicked recruit Lawrence Funderburke off his team, he refused to allow Funderburke to play for Kentucky. When asked about the series in 1999, Knight claimed that it would be fine if the series were returned to the home courts and added, "Pitino complained because we didn't play in Rupp Arena. Rick had a tough time understanding that it was a game between Kentucky and Indiana, not between him and me."

Notable games
1924: The Indiana Hoosiers and Kentucky Wildcats met for the first time on December 18, 1924, in the second game ever played at the newly opened Alumni Gymnasium on the University of Kentucky campus. Both teams were led by new coaches. The 1-1 Hoosiers were headed by first-year coach Everett Dean who would go on to compile a 162-93 record in 14 seasons at Indiana. Clarence Applegran, in his only season at Kentucky, coached a Wildcats team that was 1-0. Characterized in newspaper reports as a defensive game, IU held onto a five-point halftime lead to beat Kentucky 20-18. Indiana would eventually finish the 1924-1925 season 12-5 and the Wildcats 13-8. Alternating between Bloomington, Indiana and Lexington, Kentucky, the teams would meet each of the next three seasons with Indiana a double-digit victor in each game.
1940: The Indiana/Kentucky match-up resumed thirteen seasons later at the annual Sugar Bowl tournament in New Orleans before a record crowd of 7,500. Coached by Branch McCracken, the Hoosiers entered the game as the defending national champions with a record of 6-1. McCracken's team, who had just flown in from the West Coast after taking three out of four games from Stanford, California, USC, and UCLA, was described as being air sick. Adolph Rupp, destined to hold the title NCAA Division I men's basketball record-holder for victories, led a 5-2 Kentucky team that won the SEC men's basketball tournament and the Sugar Bowl tournament the previous season. Curly Armstrong and Bill Menke each scored 14 to help Indiana hold off the Wildcats, 48-45.
1943 and 1944: After the 1942-1943 season, McCracken took a leave of absence from Indiana University to become a lieutenant in the US Navy and was replaced by Harry Good from Indiana Central College who would take over the Indiana team during the war years. The 1943-1944 Hoosiers lost all of their returning lettermen to the armed forces and were left with a team of primarily inexperienced freshmen. Four freshmen starters, including Indiana Mr. Basketball Ed Schienbein, left for the US Navy after IU's first game. After six straight defeats (the series record), Kentucky defeated Indiana 66-41 at Jefferson County Armory in Louisville. Walter Johnson contributed 13 and Bob Brannum 12 points for the Wildcats. The victory would be the first of five straight that Kentucky would hand the Hoosiers, a feat they would duplicate later in the 1990s and the 2000s. Kentucky finished the season 19-2. Described as one of their worst seasons ever, Indiana ended up 7-15.

The two teams met at the same venue one year later. Led by Alex Groza, Wilbur Schu, Jack Tingle, the Kentucky team undefeated in their three previous games posted a 61-43 win over a 4-1 Indiana squad.

December 12, 1970: UK 95, IU 93 (OT): Kentucky's overtime win, 95-93, was led by 24 points and 12 rebounds from Tom Parker, 19 points from Kent Hollenback and 18 from Mike Casey. Indiana's George McGinnis scored 38 points and grabbed 20 rebounds. He had one of the best single performances in this rivalry. This was the final season of play at the Indiana Fieldhouse in Bloomington.
December 17, 1971: IU 90, UK 89 (2 OT): In 1971 Bob Knight took the head coaching job at Indiana. His first game against Kentucky went into double overtime with IU winning 90–89. Indiana's Steve Downing scored 47 points (on 19-of-39 shooting) and 25 rebounds in what would be one of the best all-time performances against Kentucky. From this game until the 1976 season, Indiana would only lose a single game to the Wildcats in seven meetings.
March 17, 1973: IU 72, UK 65: This match-up occurred in the NCAA tournament Mideast Regional Final in Nashville, Tennessee. Both Indiana and Kentucky were programs in transition at the time. Kentucky coach Joe B. Hall was in his first season as the successor to Adolph Rupp, who spent 42 years as Kentucky's coach. Bob Knight was in his second season at Indiana and won the Big Ten outright. IU had won the regular season matchup in Bloomington, and won in Nashville as well, making 1972-73 the first and still only time that IU or Kentucky has defeated the other twice in the same season. It was an unusually rough shooting performance for a Knight-era team (44 percent), but IU won the game at the free throw line, making 10 free throws to Kentucky's three. Steve Downing led IU with 23 points on 10-22 shooting, and Quinn Buckner added 16. John Laskowski scored 10 points on 4-5 shooting off the bench. The win in the regional final sent IU to the Final Four for the first of five times under Knight and for the first time in 20 years. The Hoosiers went on to lose to eventual NCAA champion UCLA in the national semifinals.
December 7, 1974: IU 98, UK 74: On December 7, 1974, Indiana and Kentucky met in the regular season in Bloomington with a 98-74 Indiana win. Near the end of the game, Indiana coach Bob Knight went to the Kentucky bench where the official was standing to complain about a call. Before he left, Knight hit Kentucky coach Joe B. Hall in the back of the head. UK's assistant coach Lynn Nance, a former FBI agent who was about 6 feet 5 inches, had to be restrained by Hall from hitting Knight. Hall later said, "It publicly humiliated me.".

Knight said the slap to the head was something he has done, "affectionately" to his own players for years. "But maybe someone would not like that," he said. "If Joe didn't like it, I offer an apology. I don't apologize for the intent." ... "Hall and I have been friends for a long time," Knight said. "If he wants to dissolve the friendship, that's up to him." Knight blamed the furor on Hall, noting in his inimitable style, "If it was meant to be malicious, I'd have blasted the fucker into the seats."

March 22, 1975: UK 92, IU 90: Following a contentious regular season game, Indiana and Kentucky met in the 1975 NCAA Mideast Regional Final in Dayton, Ohio. Coming into that game, the Hoosiers were on a 34-game winning streak, and the number one ranked team in America. Kentucky was ranked number five. However, Indiana star player Scott May saw limited playing time due to a broken arm in the regular season finale against Purdue. May scored 25 points in the regular season IU-UK meeting, but he managed only 2 points in seven minutes in the Tournament game, which he played with a cast on his left arm. IU surged out to an early seven-point lead before UK rallied to tie it at 44 by halftime. Despite Indiana's Kent Benson scoring 33 points (on 13-of-18 shooting) and grabbing 23 rebounds, Kentucky won 92-90.

The loss for Indiana prevented what could have been back-to-back undefeated seasons and national championships as the Hoosiers went on to take the national title in 1976. Bob Knight would later say that this 1974-1975 team was the best he ever coached, even better than the undefeated national champions of 1976. The win put UK in the Final Four in San Diego, where they dropped the NCAA title game in what would be John Wooden's last game. Kentucky's win over Indiana remains as one of the seminal non-title victories in the history of Kentucky basketball. It is on USA Today's list of the greatest NCAA tournament games of all time.

December 15, 1979: UK 69, IU 58: In 1979 the number one ranked Indiana traveled to Rupp Arena to take on 5th ranked Kentucky. Indiana, led by future NBA Hall of Famer Isiah Thomas, was handed a 69-58 defeat. Kentucky's Kyle Macy scored 12 points while Jay Shidler and Lavon Williams each added 11. Kentucky held IU to just 17 of 49 shooting (34.6 percent) and won the rebounding battle 42-29 with Fred Cowan pulling down 11 rebounds. Isiah Thomas scored 14 but IU's Randy Wittman managed just one point in 22 minutes.
March 24, 1983: UK 64, IU 59: This game occurred in the NCAA tournament Mideast Regional semifinal. The five banners in the south end of Assembly Hall honor IU's NCAA champions, and the banners in the north end honor various other accomplishments: NIT titles, Final Four appearances, the undefeated regular season of 1976. While there now are two banners listing the years of IU's 20 Big Ten titles, those weren't present during Bob Knight's tenure. Before 2000, the only Big Ten title banner honored the 1983 team, which Knight ordered as a tribute to the fans, who he credited with inspiring the team to win its final three home games, over Purdue, Illinois, and Ohio State, to seal the conference title after losing Ted Kitchel to injury. While IU survived the loss of Kitchel in the regular season, in the Tournament, his absence was felt, and IU lost to Kentucky despite strong performances by Randy Wittman and Uwe Blab.
December 8, 1984: IU 81, UK 68: Indiana's Steve Alford, as a sophomore, hit 11-of-14 shots from the field and both of his free throws attempts to drop in 24 points in an 81-64 IU victory. He also had seven assists.
December 5, 1987: UK 82, IU 76 (OT): In the inaugural game of the Big 4 Classic, an annual double-header pitting UK, IU, Louisville and Notre Dame, the 5th ranked Hoosiers took on the 2nd ranked Wildcats. Indiana freshman Jay Edwards tied the game at 71-71 on a baseline jumper with :01 showing on the clock to send the game to overtime. In the extra period with UK leading 78-76, goggle-sporting Ed Davender forced Keith Smart into a turnover, Rex Chapman dove on the loose ball and fed it to Richard Madison for a dunk – his only basket of the game – with 34 seconds left to seal the deal. Davender, who finished with 22 points, held Smart to just five points on 2 of 9 shooting. Chapman added 20 and Cedric Jenkins contributed 14 points and 10 rebounds as five Cats reached double figures. Rick Calloway, a 6-6 guard who later transferred to Kansas, scored a game-high 26 for IU.
December 2, 1989: IU 71, UK 69: Before 40,128 in the Hoosier Dome, a Kentucky team on probation nearly upset No. 14 Indiana in the first meeting between Bobby Knight and Rick Pitino. The Wildcats led 36-32 at halftime but eventually fell to the Hoosiers, 71-69. Deron Feldhaus scored 32 points for Kentucky while Indiana got 16 points and 10 rebounds from Lawrence Funderburke, whose recruitment by Kentucky under Eddie Sutton had gotten the program in trouble with the NCAA.
December 7, 1991: UK 76, IU 74: After two close losses to Indiana by a combined five points, 14th-ranked Kentucky beat 9th-ranked Indiana 76-74 under coach Rick Pitino. Jamal Mashburn led Kentucky with 21 points and eight rebounds while Deron Feldhaus scored 19 on 5 of 8 shooting beyond the arc. Kentucky managed to overcome a 40-14 margin in free throw attempts heavily favoring the Hoosiers by hitting on 11 of 23 treys. Indiana was 0-for-5 from behind the arc.
January 3, 1993: UK 81, IU 78: 4th ranked Indiana traveled to Louisville to take on 3rd ranked Kentucky. Kentucky made 16 of 41 three-pointers as 29 points each for Jamal Mashburn and Travis Ford were canceled out by 29-point games for Indiana's Calbert Cheaney and Matt Nover. Travis Ford's seven three-pointers were the most in a game by a single player in Kentucky history. Stifling defense by Rodrick Rhodes held Cheaney without a field goal over the final six minutes. Indiana's loss prevented Bob Knight from earning his 600th career victory.
December 4, 1993: IU 96, UK 84:  Prior to this game in 1993 Kentucky was ranked number one in the nation, but Indiana upset the Wildcats and earned their first of two wins over a top-ranked UK team. Indiana's Damon Bailey hit 16-of-19 free throws (record for a single game) to score 29 points. Bailey's performance in the upset earned him a spot on the cover of Sports Illustrated, which has since become an iconic image among Indiana fans. A quote from the accompanying story summarizes the atmosphere that day:

Following the win, IU led the all-time series 20-17. But it marked a turning point in the series for a while. From that game until 2011 Kentucky went 14-3 against the Hoosiers.

December 7, 1996: UK 99, IU 65: In a 99-65 UK rout, Kentucky's Derek Anderson led all scorers with 30 points while hitting 4-of-9 shots from the three-point line. Anderson also grabbed four rebounds, handed out four assists and pinched three steals. UK's Ron Mercer scored 26 points on 11-of-18 shooting. He also grabbed six rebounds and had four assists.
December 4, 1999: IU 83, UK 75: Kentucky has three five-game winning streaks over IU. Both the 1999 game and the 2005 game prevented UK from winning six in a row. In 1999, senior guards AJ Guyton (21 points, 4-6 from three) and Michael Lewis (17 points, 10-11 from the line) led IU to victory. This was Bob Knight's last IU-UK game and gave Knight a 15-17 record against UK at IU.
December 21, 2002: UK 70, IU 64: Prior to 6th ranked Indiana and 16th ranked Kentucky meeting on December 21, 2002, Indiana coach Mike Davis stated publicly that he "hated Kentucky with a passion" and wanted to win the game "in the worst way." During the game Davis, enraged by a foul not being called, ran wildly onto the court before the game was over. Indiana trailed only 65-64 when Davis exploded, but Kentucky's Keith Bogans made five of the six ensuing free throws to put the game out of reach and Kentucky went on to win the game 70-64. In a press conference following the game, Mike Davis said, "There's no way I should've acted like that. I can't explain it. I've done something to embarrass my team. ... I cost us the game. I was so emotional. I need to learn and grow from this."
December 10, 2011: IU 73, UK 72: In 2011 top-ranked Kentucky traveled to Bloomington to take on unranked Indiana. Indiana fans sensed a resurgence in the program and possible upset, with students lining up outside the arena 10 hours before tipoff to get good seats. The game remained close and hard-fought, with five lead changes in the final 121 seconds. Indiana star Christian Watford hit a 3-pointer at the buzzer, giving the Hoosiers a stunning 73-72 upset. Victor Oladipo had 13 points and five Hoosiers wound up in double figures. Watford's shot sent Indiana fans storming the court and crowding around players. Kentucky's loss was their only one of the regular season and prevented them from matching a record last set by Indiana's 1975-1976 team.

ESPN commentator Dick Vitale, who was covering the game for the network, said it was the "best game of the year" and that "[t]he atmosphere there was unreal, as I felt the building shaking after Watford hit the shot." According to Bob Kravitz, the win marked "a day when Hoosier Hysteria was restored to something akin to its former glory."

March 23, 2012: UK 102, IU 90: Kentucky was again ranked number one going into the South Regional semifinals of the 2012 NCAA Division I men's basketball tournament at Atlanta's Georgia Dome and was matched against #4 seed Indiana, who was responsible for one of UK's two defeats that season.   Led by Michael Kidd-Gilchrist (24 points) and Doron Lamb (21 points) and the defense of Anthony Davis (9 points), Kentucky defeated Indiana by a score of 102-90 to advance to the Regional Finals on their way to their eighth NCAA Championship.

March 19, 2016: IU 73, UK 67: Kentucky took on 5th-seeded Indiana in the Round of 32 but Indiana prevailed. Indiana would go on to lose to North Carolina in the Sweet 16.

End of series
In 2011 Kentucky coach John Calipari briefly discussed the possibility of ending one of Kentucky's annual games against rivals Louisville, North Carolina, or Indiana.  A last-second shot which propelled Indiana to victory over top-ranked Kentucky and another meeting in the 2012 NCAA Tournament (won by Kentucky) helped re-kindle the rivalry's intensity; however, Calipari and Indiana head coach Tom Crean were unable to resolve the issue of whether to play future games on the respective teams' home courts or at neutral sites. This prompted the schools to cancel their annual meeting for the 2012-13 season. After IU athletic director Fred Glass reopened negotiations on May 10, 2012, Calipari rejected Glass's compromise to play two games at Lucas Oil Stadium and one game apiece at Assembly Hall and Rupp Arena, thus ending the series.

Game results
Winning team is shown. Ranking of the team at the time of the game by the AP poll is shown by the team name.

Notes

A 1973 NCAA Elite Eight
B 1975 NCAA Elite Eight
C 1983 NCAA Sweet Sixteen
D 2012 NCAA Sweet Sixteen
E 2016 NCAA round of 32

Wins by location

Wins by site

Football

Women's basketball
The Indiana Hoosiers women's basketball team played its first varsity season in 1971–72, and Kentucky Wildcats women's basketball had its first varsity season in 1974–75. As of the 2021–22 season, Kentucky leads the all-time series 14–13, with the most recent match being an 88–67 win for No. 8 Indiana over No. 13 Kentucky in Bloomington on November 14, 2021.

The first women's basketball game between Indiana and Kentucky was on January 24, 1974, and an 88-54 win for Indiana, the season before Kentucky women's basketball became varsity. The Indiana-Kentucky women's basketball series was played annually on a home-and-home basis from the 1976–77 to 1990–91 seasons, except for the December 30, 1990 game played in Reno, Nevada for the New Year's Classic tournament hosted by the University of Nevada, Reno, and again from 1993–94 to 1997–98. The series then went on a nine-year pause until the championship round of the Women's Sports Foundation Tournament on November 12, 2006, a 54–51 Indiana win over No. 15 Kentucky in Lexington. This was Indiana's sixth straight win in the series dating back to 1993.

After a 14-year hiatus, the series resumed when Kentucky announced on November 19, 2020, nearly a week before the delayed start of the 2020–21 season, the addition of a December 5 home game vs. Indiana. Kentucky scheduled this game to make up for COVID-19 protocols preventing the annual game vs. in-state rival Louisville from being hosted that season. In the game, No. 11 Kentucky rallied from down 14 to beat No. 13 Indiana 72–68, Kentucky's first win over Indiana in 30 years.

In the 2022 NCAA Division I women's basketball tournament, Indiana got the No. 3 seed of the Bridgeport region and hosted the first two rounds. Kentucky got the No. 6 seed. Had both teams won their first-round games, they would have met for the third time in 16 months in the second round. On March 19, Indiana beat No. 14 seed Charlotte 85–51, Kentucky lost to No. 11 seed Princeton 69–62, thus denying another Indiana–Kentucky matchup in the second round.

Baseball
The first Indiana–Kentucky baseball game took place on April 16, 1903, an 8-5 win for Kentucky. As of the 2021 season, Kentucky has a 24–19 series lead, with the most recent result being a 5–2 Kentucky win in Lexington on May 4, 2019.

References
General

 

Specific

College baseball rivalries in the United States
College basketball rivalries in the United States
College soccer rivalries in the United States
Indiana Hoosiers men's basketball
Indiana Hoosiers football
Kentucky Wildcats men's basketball
Kentucky Wildcats football
Kentucky Wildcats men's soccer
Indiana Hoosiers men's soccer
Indiana Hoosiers women's basketball
Indiana Hoosiers women's soccer
Kentucky Wildcats women's basketball
Kentucky Wildcats women's soccer
Indiana Hoosiers baseball
Kentucky Wildcats baseball